Frijoles Puercos (pig beans) is a traditional Mexican dish. The dish is characterized by blended beans stewed with lard, olives, chile pepper, chorizo, Chihuahua cheese Many variations are found in different regions across Mexico.

References

Legume dishes
Mexican cuisine